Coleophora delicatella is a moth of the family Coleophoridae. It is found in Afghanistan.

The larvae feed on Caroxylon turkestanicum. They feed on the generative organs of their host plant.

References

delicatella
Moths described in 1967
Moths of Asia